Dauchingen is a municipality in the district of Schwarzwald-Baar in Baden-Württemberg, Germany.

History
Some of the earliest evidence of human habitation of the area of Dauchingen are Roman and suggest a villa rustica from between the years 88 to 138 AD. The first settlements in the area however are Alemanni and dates to 270 AD. The first documentation of a settlement at Dauchingen comes from 1092 and refers to it "Tuchingen", a property of St. George's Abbey in the Black Forest. In 1405, the Fürstenbergs renounced their claim to Dauchingen in favor of the County of Zollern. The town was sold in 1479 by Gregor von Roggwil of Constance to the Free Imperial City of Rottweil.

In 1803, Rottweil was mediatized to the Electorate of Württemberg, and Dauchingen thus became a possession of Württemberg. Dauchingen was assigned to the district of Villingen. The town of Dauchingen began a steady spread to the south in the latter half of the 1970s.

Geography
Dauchingen is a municipality (Gemeinde) of the Schwarzwald-Baar district of Baden-Württemberg, one of the 16 states of the Federal Republic of Germany. The municipality lies at the northern edge of the district, along its border with the district of Rottweil. Inside Schwarzwald-Baar, Dauchingen borders Villingen-Schwenningen. Dauchingen is physically located in the Baar region. Elevation above sea level in the municipal area ranges from a high of  Normalnull (NN) to a low of  NN.

Coat of arms
The coat of arms for Dauchingen displays a lion in yellow, facing to the right and holding a white plowshare in its forepaws, upon a field of red. This pattern was derived from a town seal used in 1807 that showed the Zähringen Lion, holding the letter "D" in its paws. The coat of arms received approval for official use by the Federal Ministry of the Interior, which also issued an accompanying flag, on 18 August 1961.

Transportation
Dauchingen is connected to Germany's network of roadways by the Bundesstraße 27 and  federal roadways and Bundesautobahn 98. It is also connected to Germany's railways by the Rottweil–Villingen railway, which passes through the municipality.

References

External links
 

Schwarzwald-Baar-Kreis
Populated places on the Neckar basin
Populated riverside places in Germany